Forest Oaks is a census-designated place (CDP) in Guilford County, North Carolina, United States. The population was 3,890 as of the 2010 census, up from 3,241 in 2000.

Geography
Forest Oaks is located in southeastern Guilford County at  (35.983663, -79.704720). At the center of the CDP is the Forest Oaks Country Club. The town is also known for Southeast Guilford Middle and High Schools, and is bordered to the west by Joseph M. Hunt Highway (U.S. Route 421).

The majority of the CDP drains to Beaver Creek, a northeastward-flowing tributary of Little Alamance Creek and part of the Great Alamance Creek–Haw River–Cape Fear River watershed.

Demographics

As of the census of 2000, there were 3,241 people, 1,227 households, and 1,065 families residing in the CDP. The population density was 638.8 people per square mile (246.8/km2). There were 1,252 housing units at an average density of 246.8 per square mile (95.3/km2). The racial makeup of the CDP was 94.29% White, 4.54% African American, 0.19% Native American, 0.19% Asian, 0.28% from other races, and 0.52% from two or more races. Hispanic or Latino of any race were 0.34% of the population.

There were 1,227 households, out of which 32.6% had children under the age of 18 living with them, 79.5% were married couples living together, 5.2% had a female householder with no husband present, and 13.2% were non-families. 12.0% of all households were made up of individuals, and 5.3% had someone living alone who was 65 years of age or older. The average household size was 2.64 and the average family size was 2.86.

In the CDP, the population was spread out, with 22.5% under the age of 18, 5.4% from 18 to 24, 23.3% from 25 to 44, 35.2% from 45 to 64, and 13.6% who were 65 years of age or older. The median age was 44 years. For every 100 females, there were 97.6 males. For every 100 females age 18 and over, there were 96.6 males.

The median income for a household in the CDP was $61,827, and the median income for a family was $67,159. Males had a median income of $45,313 versus $29,980 for females. The per capita income for the CDP was $25,682. About 5.2% of families and 4.7% of the population were below the poverty line, including 7.8% of those under age 18 and 3.6% of those age 65 or over.

References

Census-designated places in Guilford County, North Carolina
Census-designated places in North Carolina